David Robert  Judge is an English actor who is best known for his role in Hollyoaks as Danny Valentine. He also played Jordan Ryder in ITV police drama The Bill.

Filmography
Hollyoaks
Doctors
Casualty
The Bill
Holby City
Weekender

References

External links

English male soap opera actors
Living people
1984 births